Hamidov or Khamidov is a central-Asian masculine surname, its feminine counterpart is Hamidova or Khamidova. It may refer to
Abdurahim Hamidov (1952–2013), Uzbekistani lutenist
Isgandar Hamidov (born 1948), Azerbaijani politician
Shukur Hamidov, Azerbaijani military officer
Sitora Hamidova (born 1989), Uzbekistani long-distance runner
Sukhrob Khamidov (born 1975), Tajikistan football forward